Gail Omvedt (2 August 1941 – 25 August 2021) was an American-born Indian sociologist and human rights activist. She was a prolific writer and published numerous books on the anti-caste movement, Dalit politics, and women's struggles in India. Omvedt was involved in Dalit and anti-caste movements, environmental, farmers' and women's movements, especially with rural women.

Omvedt's dissertation was titled Cultural Revolt in a Colonial Society: The Non-Brahman Movement in Western India, 1873-1930.

Omvedt's academic writing includes numerous books and articles on class, caste and gender issues. Besides undertaking many research projects, she was a consultant for FAO, UNDP and NOVIB and served as a Dr Ambedkar Chair Professor at NISWASS in Orissa, a professor of sociology at the University of Pune and an Asian guest professor at the Nordic Institute of Asian Studies, Copenhagen. She was a senior fellow at the Nehru Memorial Museum and Library and research director of the Krantivir Babuji Patankar Sanstha.

Biography
Gail Omvedt was born in Minneapolis, and studied at Carleton College and at UC Berkeley where she earned her PhD in sociology in 1973. When she went to India for the first time in 1963~64, she was an English tutor on a Fulbright Fellowship. Omveldt again came to India for research in the 1970s. At that time she met her future husband, Bharat Patankar, and his social activist mother,Indumati Patankar. After marrying Bharat, she lived with her husband and his extended family in a village called Kasegaon in Indian state of Maharashtra. She became an Indian citizen in 1983.

In the years before her death she was working as a consulting sociologist on gender, environment and rural development, for the United Nations Development Programme (UNDP), Oxfam Novib (NOVIB) and other institutions. She was a consultant for UN agencies and NGOs, served as a Dr. Ambedkar Chair Professor at NISWASS in Orissa, a professor of sociology at the University of Pune, as Asian Guest Professor at the Nordic Institute of Asian Studies, Copenhagen and as a Senior Fellow at the Nehru Memorial Museum and Library, New Delhi. She was a Visiting Professor and Coordinator, School of Social Justice, University of Pune and a Fellow at the Indian Institute of Advanced Study, Shimla. Gail Omvedt was a former Chair Professor for the Dr. B.R. Ambedkar Chair of Social Change and Development at IGNOU. Omvedt died on 25 August 2021 in Maharashtra at the age of 80.

Activism 
Omvedt worked with social movements in India, including the Dalit and anti-caste movements, environmental movements, farmers' movements and especially with rural women. She was active in Shramik Mukti Dal, Stri Mukti Sangarsh Chalval which works on issues of abandoned women in Sangli and Satara districts of southern Maharashtra, and the Shetkari Mahila Aghadi, which works on issues of women's land rights and political power.

Views
Gail Omvedt was an Ambedkarite scholar who contributed immensely to the anti-caste movement. Omvedt was critical of the religious scriptures of Hinduism (or what she specifically regarded as "brahminism") for what she argued is their promotion of a caste-based society.

In addition to her criticism of their purported advocacy for the caste-system, Omvedt also dismissed the Hindu tradition of venerating the Vedas as holy. In a 2000 open letter published in The Hindu addressed to then-BJP President Bangaru Laxman, she gave her perspective on the Rigveda:

Omvedt posits that Hindutva groups foster an ethnic definition of Hinduism based on geography, ancestry and heritage in order to create a solidarity amongst various castes, despite the prevalence of caste-based discrimination.

Omvedt endorsed the stand taken by Dalit activists at the 2001 World Conference Against Racism that caste discrimination is similar to racism in regarding discriminated groups as "biologically inferior and socially dangerous".

She called the United States a "racist country" and has advocated for affirmative action; however, she compared American positive-discrimination policies favorably to those of India, stating:

and, with respect to perceptions of "group performance", in the United States and India, Omvedt wrote:

She on occasion supported big-dam projects and GMO crops.

Controversy and criticism

Andre Beteille's criticism
Omvedt's portrayal of caste-discrimination and violence as forms of "racism" was opposed by the Indian government and sociologists in India, including Andre Beteille, who while acknowledging that discrimination exists, deeply opposed treating caste as a form of racism "simply to protect against prejudice and discrimination", describing such attempts as "politically mischievous" and "worse, scientifically nonsense".
Beteille argues (that):

Marxist critique
Omvedt was criticized for a perceived "anti-statist" bias in her writing as well as "neo-liberal" economic sympathies. Scholars have also questioned the sincerity of her claims regarding the "authenticity" of her work, writing:

Works
Omvedt's dissertation was on Cultural Revolt in a Colonial Society: The NonBrahman Movement in Western India, 1873-1930 (reprint of 1976 book) (New Delhi, Manohar, 2011).

Omvedt's academic writing includes numerous books and articles on class, caste and gender issues, most notably:

 Cultural Revolt in a Colonial Society: The NonBrahman Movement in Maharashtra (Scientific Socialist Education Trust, 1966)
 "We Will Smash This Prison!.: Indian Women in Struggle " (Zed, 1980)
 "Violence Against Women: New Movements And New Theories In India" (Kali for Women, 1991)
 Reinventing Revolution: New Social Movements in India (M.E. Sharpe, 1993)
 Gender and Technology: Emerging Asian Visions (1994)
  Dalits And The Democratic Revolution: Dr. Ambedkar And The Dalit Movement In Colonial India (Sage India, 1994)
 Dalit Visions: the Anticaste movement and Indian Cultural Identity (Orient Longman, 1995)
 Growing Up Untouchable: A Dalit Autobiography (Rowman and Littlefield, 2000)
 Buddhism in India : Challenging Brahmanism and Caste (SageIndia, 2003)
 "Ambedkar: Towards an Enlightened India " (Penguin, 2005)
 Seeking Begumpura: The Social Vision of Anticaste Intellectuals (New Delhi, Navayana, 2009)
 "Understanding Caste: From Buddha To Ambedkar And Beyond" (New Delhi: Orient Blackswan, 2011)
  Songs of Tukoba with Bharat Patankar she has published (translations) (Manohar, 2012)
 Jotirao Phule and the Ideology of Social Revolution in India

Awards
 Honorary Woodrow Wilson Fellowship, 1964–65
 Fulbright Fellowship as Tutor in English in India, 1963-1964
 University of California Graduate Fellowships, 1964–65, 1965–66
 American Institute of Indian Studies, Junior Fellowship for PhD research in India on "The NonBrahman Movement in Maharashtra," January–December 1971
 American Association of University Women, Fellowship for research on "Women's Movement in India," January–December 1975
 Savitribai Phule Puraskar, Padmashri Kavivarya Narayan Surve Sarvajanik Vacanalay, Nashik, 2002
 Dr. Ambedkar Chetna Award, Manavwadi Rachna Manch Punjab, August 2003
 ABP Majha Sanman Purskar, 2012
 Matoshree Bhimabai Ambedkar Award (2012)
 Vitthal Ramji Shinde Award, April 2015
 Lifetime Achievement Award from the Indian Sociological Society, 2018

See also
 Eleanor Zelliot
 Forward Press

References

External links

 Blog by Gail Omvedt
 Profile of Gail Omvedt, UC Berkeley sociology website
 Profile of Gail Omvedt, University of Michigan website
 Profile of Gail Omvedt, Sage Publication
 Profile of Gail Omvedt, Center for the Advanced Study of India, University of Pennsylvania.
 Gail Omvedt, An Open Letter To Arundhati Roy
 Gail Omvedt, The Hindutva bomb, published in The Hindu, 20 June 1998
 Gail Omvedt, Caste System and Hinduism, Economic and Political Weekly, 13 March 2004
 
 Why Dalits dislike environmentalists - Gail Omvedt

1941 births
2021 deaths
American sociologists
American women sociologists
Indian women sociologists
Indian sociologists
Indian women activists
Environmental sociologists
American women social scientists
English-language writers from India
Indian political writers
20th-century Indian educators
20th-century Indian women scientists
20th-century Indian social scientists
20th-century American women
21st-century Indian social scientists
21st-century Indian women scientists
20th-century women educators
20th-century American people
American emigrants to India
People from Minneapolis